Hwang Young-cho (born 22 March 1970) is a former South Korean athlete, winner of the marathon race at the 1992 Summer Olympics and 1994 Asian Games.

Career

Born in Samcheok, South Korea, Hwang was a promising track athlete in his junior years, but after his first marathon in 1991, which he won, decided to specialize in marathon.

The Barcelona Olympic marathon was only fourth of his career. He had won two and placed second in his three previous marathon competitions. In Barcelona, Hwang was in the leading pack from the start, but in a slowly run race, this group still numbered thirty runners at the halfway mark. However, runners gradually lost contact with the leaders in the second half of the race, until at 35 km, only Hwang and Kōichi Morishita from Japan remained. They had quite a memorable struggle, until Hwang broke free after 40 km to win a gold medal.

Hwang raced sparingly after Barcelona, and he retired after injury prevented him from representing South Korea in the 1996 Olympics.

Hwang was depicted on the 2006 Berlin Marathon medal to commemorate his victory in the 1992 Olympic marathon event.

South Koreans' Olympic marathon medals
Hwang has been one of two Korean athletes to win the Olympic marathon. The other winner was Sohn Kee-chung. Hwang's contemporary South Korean athlete Lee Bong-Ju won the silver medal in the marathon at the 1996 Summer Olympics held in Atlanta, and Nam Sung-yong won the bronze medal at the 1936 Summer Olympics in Berlin at the same race that Sohn Kee-chung won.

Achievements
1991
Summer Universiade, winner of the men's marathon in Sheffield.
1992
Summer Olympics,  winner of the men's marathon in Barcelona.
1994
Asian Games,  winner of the men's marathon in Hiroshima.
Boston Marathon, fourth place in a new Korean record (2:08:09)

See also
Sohn Kee-Chung
Lee Bong-ju

External links
 
 databaseOlympics

1970 births
Living people
South Korean male marathon runners
Athletes (track and field) at the 1992 Summer Olympics
Olympic athletes of South Korea
Olympic gold medalists for South Korea
Korea University alumni
Asian Games medalists in athletics (track and field)
Medalists at the 1992 Summer Olympics
Asian Games gold medalists for South Korea
South Korean male long-distance runners
Olympic gold medalists in athletics (track and field)
Medalists at the 1994 Asian Games
Pyeonghae Hwang clan
Athletes (track and field) at the 1994 Asian Games
Universiade medalists in athletics (track and field)
Universiade gold medalists for South Korea
People from Samcheok
Sportspeople from Gangwon Province, South Korea
20th-century South Korean people